The An Anthology of Noise & Electronic Music is a seven album compilation of 176 tracks of historic noise music and electronic music released on 15 CDs between the years 2001 and 2011. It was curated, noted and edited by Guy-Marc Hinant.

Most all of the CDs are out of print. The breadth of the anthology makes it comparable to Harry Everett Smith’s 1952 Anthology of American Folk Music.

Anthology #1
Luigi Russolo & Antonio Russolo Corale 1:57 / 1921 
Walter Ruttmann Wochende11:17 / 1930
Pierre Schaeffer Cinq études de bruits: étude violette 3:18 / 1948 
Henri Pousseur  Scambi 6:27 / 1957 
Gordon Mumma The Dresden Interleaf 13 February 1945 12:43 / 1965 
Angus MacLise, Tony Conrad & John Cale Trance #2 5:07 / 1965 
Philip Jeck, Otomo Yoshihide & Martin Tétreault Untitled #1 6:06 / 2000 
Survival Research Laboratories October 24, 1992 Graz, Austria 6:11 / 1992 
Einstürzende Neubauten Ragout: Küchen Rezept Von Einstürzende Neubauten 4:08 / 1998 
Konrad Boehmer Aspekt 15:13 / 1966 
Nam June Paik Hommage à John Cage 4:13 / 1958 
John Cage Rozart mix 7:18 / 1965 
Sonic Youth Audience 6:00 / 1983 
Edgard Varèse Poème électronique 8:00 / 1958 
Iannis Xenakis Concret PH 4:40 / 1958 
DJ Spooky That Subliminal Kid FTP > Bundle / Conduit 23 8:07 / 2001 
Pauline Oliveros A little noise in the system (Moog System)  30:16 / 1966 
Ryoji Ikeda One minute 1:00 / 1997

Anthology #2
Vladimir Ussachevsky + Otto Luening Incantation for tape 2:36 / 1953
Luc Ferrari Visage V 10:36 / 1958 
Tod Dockstader Aerial > Song 12:56 / 2002 
Johanna Beyer Music of the spheres 6:00 / 1938 
Morton Subotnick Mandolin 7:02 / 1962 
Daphne Oram Four aspects 8:14 / 1960 
Scanner Emily 4:53 / 1993 
Hugh Davies Quintet 12:11 / 1967 
Alan R. Splet Space travel w/ Changing Choral Textures 4:04 / 1980 
Kim Cascone Zephirum scan 4:49 / 2002 
Autechre Bronchus one.1 6:04 / 1991 
Multiphonic Ensemble On/Off edit 9:10 / 2001 
Meira Asher + Guy Harries Torture / Bodyparts 3:42 / 2001
Choose / Lasse Steen Purzuit ov noize 5:36 / 1994 
Woody McBride Pulp 6:11 / 1993 
Arcane Device Lathe 5:56 / 1988 
Laibach Industrial ambients 9:58 / 1980 
SPK Slogun 6:15 / 1979 
Percy Grainger Free music #1 (for four theremins)  1:28 / 1936
Sun Ra And The Arkestra Imagination 2:00 / 1965 
Captain Beefheart She's too much for my mirror/ my human gets me Blues 5:21 / 1969

Anthology #3
Bernard Parmegiani De natura sonorum: matières induites 3:44 / 1975
Hugh Le Caine Short presentation of the 1948 Sackbut: the Sackbut blues, followed by a noisome pestilence 3:25 / 1953-1958
Keith Fullerton Whitman/Hrvatski Stereo music for Serge Modular Prototype 5:30 / 2003
Ilhan Mimaroglu The last largo 9:33 / 1989 
Michael J. Schumacher Room Pieces: excerpt 4:41 / 2003
Justin Bennett Ovipool 3:25 / 2003 
Scott Gibbons/Lilith Reciprocal 3:30 / 1992 
Fred Szymanski Modular(2)-Flume 6:41 / 2003 
Francisco López Untitled #148 10:03 / 2003 
Zbigniew Karkowski Execution of intelligence 8:20 / 2004
Masami Akita / Merzbow Birds and warhorse 11:30 / 2004
Michel Chion Requiem: Dies Irae 6:00 / 1973
Erkki Kurenniemi Sähkösoittimen Ääniä #4+#1 5:26 / 1971 
Carsten Nicolai/Alva Noto Time...dot(3)  4:26 / 2000
Peter Rehberg/Pita Early work 6 3:00 / 1984 
Herbert Eimert + Robert Beyer Klangstudies II 4:43 / 1952
Günther Rabl Eve 6:00 / 1987 
Asmus Tietchens Teilmenge 35 C 4:40 / 2004 
Michael Rother Feuerland 7:20 / 1976 
Faust The Faust tapes: untitled #16+#17 2:55 / 1973 
To Rococo Rot Contacte 4:30 / 2004 
Rune Lindblad Till Zakynthos (Op. 205) 13:39 / 1988 
Carl Michael Von Hausswolff + Erik Pauser/Phauss Eternal love #3 13:07 / 1993

Anthology #4
Halim El-Dabh Wire recorder piece 2:01 / 1944 
György Ligeti Pièce Électronique #3 2:15 / 1958 
Jean-Claude Risset Mutations 10:32 1969 
Beatriz Ferreyra Demeures aquatiques 7:20 / 1967 
Maja Ratkje Vox 13:23 / 2005 
Laurie Spiegel Sediment 9:16 / 1972 
Steve Reich Pendulum music 7:27 / 1968 
Stephen Vitiello Marfa mix 4:15 / 2003 
eRikm Ressac 4:41 / 2003 
Wang Changcun Sea-Food 4:49 / 2005 
Chlorgeschlecht Unyoga 2:40 / 2003 
Gottfried Michael Koenig Funktion grau 10:15 / 1969 
Milan Knížák Broken music composition 3:28 / 1979
Les Rallizes Dénudés Fucked up and naked 8:33 / 1977  
Vibracathedral Orchestra Weaving the magic 4:45 / 2003 
Andy Hawkins River Blindness 10:11 / 1995 
Alvin Lucier Still And Moving Lines Of Silence In Families Of Hyperbolas: Voice 11:39 / 1974 
The Loop Orchestra Circa 1901 8:00 / 2005 
John Watermann Still warm 3:00 / 1989 
François Bayle + Robert Wyatt + Kevin Ayers William S. Burroughs Present time exercises 2:23 / 1971  
James Whitehead Air attack over Kabul airfield 4:14 / 2005 
Jean-Marc Vivenza Simultanéité aérienne 8:52 / 1994 
Olivier Messiaen Oraison 7:42 / 1937

Anthology #5
Rogelio Sosa Vinylika 7:02 
Christian Galaretta Marañon (Part VI)  10:25 
Li Chin Sung aka Dickson Dee Shame (Tetsuo Furudate sound materials remix)  4:58 
François-Bernard Mâche Prélude 5:30 
Richard Maxfield Pastoral symphony 4:02 
Wolf Vostell Elektronicher dé-collage. Happening raum 2:59
Charlemagne Palestine Seven organism study 7:53 
André Boucourechliev Texte 2 4:36 
Helmut Lachenmann Scenario 12:30 
Alireza Mashayekhi Shur, op.15 6:29 
Claude Ballif Points, mouvements 10:14
Mauricio Kagel Antithèse 9:21
Vladimir Mayakovsky And Would You?  0:33 
Raoul Hausmann Fmsbw 0:46 
Gil Joseph Wolman Mégapneumies (24 Mars 1963)  4:55 
Léo Kupper Electro-Poème 5:55 
Josef Anton Riedl Leonce Und Lena 2:18 
Sten Hanson + Henri Chopin Tête À Tête 5:08 
Dajuin Yao Satisfaction of oscillation 9:27 
Pere Ubu Sentimental Journey 7:02 
Ground Zero Live 1992 0:59 
Maso Yamazaki Maso Takushi Spectrum ripper 3:33 
Sutcliffe Jügend Blind ignorance 5:40 
Club Moral L'enfer est intime 6:33 
Dub Taylor Lumière (part I) 17:12

Anthology #6
Israël Martinez Mi Vida (2007) 06:59 
Ata Ebtekar / Sote Turquoise gas in Ice (2008)   03:36
Joseph Nechvatal Ego Masher (1983) 07:05
Oliver Stummer + Liesl Ujvary Trautorium Jetztzeit #4 (1930 sound) 03:44 
Henry Cowell The Banshee (1925-57) 02:23 
Dick Raaymakers Piano-forte (1959-60) 04:55 
Manuel Rocha Iturbide Estudio Antimatierico N°1 (1989) 05:02 
Tetsuo Furudate (2008) 06:26
Kohei Gomi/Pain Jerk Aufheben (1993)   06:28 
Hijokaidan Untitled (1994)   11:54
Incapacitants Shall We Die?  (1990)   06:25
Torturing Nurse Yes or No (2010) 04:49 
Sachiko M 28082000 (2000) 05:32 
Ultraphonist How to practice scales (2000) 03:07
Z'ev 12 November 1980, Melkweg, Amsterdam (1980)    07:31
Daniel Menche Fulmination (2009)   12:00 
John Wiese New Wave Dust (2004) 02:25 
Rico Schwantes/The Pain Barrier Virus (2003) 05:29 
Julie Rousse Flesh Barbie Techno Fuck (2008) 04:45
Bird Palace/Cristian Vogel + Pablo Palacio Phing (2009)   04:23
Robert Piotrowicz Lincoln Sea Ice Walic (2009)   08:09
Tzvi Avni Vocalise (1964) 05:18
Else Marie Pade Syv Cirkler (1958) 07:05 
John Duncan The Nazca Transmissions #2 (2005) 08:10 
Stephen O'Malley Dolmens & Lighthouses (2009) 06:53
Ilios/Dimitris Kariofilis The continuum of emanation from the One (2009) 06:06

Anthology #7
Henry Jacobs Sonata for Loudspeakers (1953-4) 9'20 
Tziga Vertov Radio-ear Radio Pravda (1930) 2'58 
Bebe and Louis Barron Bells of Atlantis (1952) 9'00 
Luciano Berio Thema (Omaggio a Joyce) (1958) 6'12 
Bülent Arel Electronic Music (1961) 8'37 
Don Preston Analog Heaven #6 (1975) 3'04 
Slawek Kwi + Siobhan McDonald Lava Samples 2'03 
Benjamin Thigpen Thread0 (2011) 5'24 
Helmut Schäfer Infuse (2005-6) 7'36 
Novi sad The insolence of a poppy (2011) 13'23 
Saule Paperfilm (2002) 11'22 
Édouard-Léon Scott de Martinville Au clair de la lune (1860) 0'16
John Oswald Vertical Time 9'58
Israel Quellet Pour percussion et saturation (2007) 2'21 
Dennis Wong Sin:Net Decomposition  5'03 
Anla Courtis Mind Broncoespasmo 2'36 
Fausto Romitelli Trash TV Trance (2002) 10'10 
Justin K. Broadrick Guitar Three (1995) 10'21
Storm Bugs Cash Wash/Eat good Beans (1980) 3'41 
E.A.R. Beyond the Pale (1992) 14'49 
Henry Cow From Trondheim (1976) 13'06 
Osso Exótico Rota de inverno (1994) 4'45
Eugeniusz Rudnik Collage (1965) 4'59
Eduardo Polonio Transparencias (2011) 7'07
Cabaret Voltaire Chance versus Causuality (1979) 5'47 
Mika Vainio Transformer in 7 (2011) 5'59
Alma Laprida + Juan Jose Calarco Contorso (2011) 2'36
Klangkrieg Korpus 1 (1996) 3'37 
Gintas Kraptavicius 4m (2011) 7'19 
Warong Rachapreecha Shambles (2012) 0'56 
The New Blockaders Blockade is Resistance (1983) 8'12 
GX Jupitter-Larsen / The Haters Fuechen (1985) 5'20
The Rita Skate (2009) 4'59 
To Die Terhempas luka / Jurang nestapa (2011) 1'03 
Agro / B. Spivey + R. Anderson Only Those Who Attempt The Impossible Will Achieve the Absurd (1995) 4'08 
Jamka Wild Rosa Tree (2010) 5'48
Erin Sexton Suspend / 2 Electromagnetic Amplifiers (2011) 4:52
Gustavo Serpa Astro Metal (2008) 6'04
Anonymous Untitled'' (unknown) 0'23

See also 
 List of record labels

Notes
 

2011 compilation albums
2001 compilation albums
Noise music compilation albums
Electronic compilation albums